Konda Polam is a 2021 Indian Telugu-language action thriller film directed by Krish Jagarlamudi. Produced by First Frame Entertainments, it stars Panja Vaisshnav Tej and Rakul Preet Singh while Sai Chand, Kota Srinivasa Rao and Nassar play supporting roles. The film is an adaptation of the eponymous novel by Sannapureddy Venkata Rami Reddy. Konda Polam was released on 8 October 2021 and ended up as a commercial failure.

Plot
Kataru Ravindra Yadav "Ravi" has passed the Indian Forest Service exam conducted by UPSC with top marks. During the interview, he is asked why he wants to join the Indian Forest Service?

In the past, Ravi was the only educated man in his village of shepherds, but he couldn't find a job despite searching for 4 years in Hyderabad due to his lack of confidence. Finally, after his grandfather insistence he decided help his father's profession because his father not allowed his elder brother because he was newly married so instead to come with them he need to spend sometime with his wife. So he allowed Ravi to come with him. In the drought times the situation forces them to take the sheep to forests for pastures to feed the sheep and water to drink for 40 days (This system is called Kondapolam). At first, he is a scared fish out of water amidst the shepherds in the forests and hills they travel through. However, he meets Obulamma "Obu", a fearless and kind young orphan woman, who helps him learn about shepherding and nature along with the other shepherds. Their journey is hazardous as they face tigers, sandalwood smugglers, goat thieves, limited food and water supplies, and the risk they might not find a suitable environment for the goats to graze. Ravi learns quickly and uses his newfound skills to fight these threats. Eventually, Ravi and Obu fall in love, but Ravi's father insists that he stay away from her due to his unemployment, so he rejects her advances. Finally, Ravi comes faces to face with the tiger and, reflecting on his previous lack of initiative, bravely stands up to it and makes it flee.

Back in the interview, Ravi explains that his experience with the tiger gave him a confidence that wasn't in his life before, and later he got the corporate job he dreams for but he was not satisfied with the job he got and he resigns it prepared for IFoS because he wants to serve in the Forest Service to help his village and solve their problems and to protect Forest. Leaving the interviewers impressed, he is made a DFO and returns to his village amidst pomp and splendor. He then declares his love for Obu and the two embrace.

Cast

 Panja Vaisshnav Tej as Kataru Ravindranath Yadav "Ravi"
 Rakul Preet Singh as Obulamma "Obu"
 Sai Chand as Guravappa, Ravi's father. 
 Kota Srinivasa Rao as Ravi's grandfather 
 Nassar as Head of UPSC Interview board (Cameo)
 Annapurna as Ravi's Grandmother. 
 Hema as villager
 Anthony
 Ravi Prakash as Ankayenna
 Syamala as Subhadra, Ankayenna's wife (Cameo role)
 Mahesh Vitta as Bhaskar
 Racha Ravi as Siripellu
 Ashok Vardhan
 Anand Vihari                           
 Pranitha as Ravi's sister
 Udhbav Raghunandhan as Ravi's elder brother.

Production

Konda Polam novel recommendation given to Krish by other Director Mohan Krishna Indraganti. After reading this novel he decided made a film on this in 2020, Krish Jagarlamudi acquired the rights of novel Konda Polam by Sannapureddi Venkata Ramireddy. He adapted the novel to make it a theatrical extravaganza, casting Panja Vaishnav Tej and Rakul Preet Singh in the lead. In September 2020, it was reported that Rakul Preet Singh resumed the shooting of the film which is being shot in Vikarabad, Telangana forest. This film is major part had shot on lockdown 1 under biobubble with the limited cast and crew.  In an interview Krish, the director of the film said, “During famines, many people from the shepherding community go to forest areas along with their sheep for their livelihood. This process is called 'Konda Polam'. We will be showcasing this adventurous journey very clearly in this film.” In the novel there is no character called Obulamma, he wrote the character for the film to get into a commercial template he added.

Soundtrack

The soundtrack is composed by M. M. Keeravani and lyrics are penned by M.Keeravaani, Chandrabose and Sirivennela Seetharama Sastry. "Obulamma" first track of the soundtrack was released on 27 August 2021 by Mango Music. "Shwaasalo" the second song was released on 30 September.

Soundtrack album was launched in an event held at Kurnool, Andhra Pradesh on 2 October 2021. Shreya Ghoshal and M. M. Keeravani's collaboration is back for the song "Chettekki" after a decade. She rendered "Chiranjeeva" for 2011 film Badrinath composed by him.

Reception 
The film received mixed to positive reviews. Critics commended the unique story, visuals and acting, with the use of body language and eyes being particularly noticed. However, the pacing and length was criticized, with the need for certain scenes and a musical duet being questioned.

References

External links 
 

2021 films
2020s Telugu-language films
Indian action thriller films
2021 adventure films
Films directed by Krish
Films scored by M. M. Keeravani
Films shot in Telangana
Films based on Indian novels
Films based on adventure novels
Films set in Andhra Pradesh
Films shot in Andhra Pradesh
Films set in forests